The Ministry of Transport was a department of the Albanian Government responsible for the transport, infrastructure, technical standards, water supply and sanitation, and urban waste management.

History

Reorganization
Since the establishment of the institution, the Ministry of Transport has undergone several administrative changes to its organizational structure. When a new department was formed, it often merged with the ministry thus expanding its role, subsequently leading to the name of the ministry being changed. If that department later broke off as a separate ministry or was dissolved, the ministry reverted to its original name.

 Ministry of Transport (1987–1991)
 Ministry of Transports (1991–1992)
 Ministry of Transports and Communications (1992–1994)
 Ministry of Industry, Transport and Trade (1994–1997)
 Ministry of Public Works and Transport (1997–1999)
 Ministry of Transport (1999–2002)
 Ministry of Transports and Telecommunication (2002–2005)
 Ministry of Public Works, Transport and Telecommunication (2005–2010)
 Ministry of Public Works and Transport (2010–2013)
 Ministry of Transport and Infrastructure (2013–2017)

Subordinate institutions
 General Directorate of Policy
 Directorate of Transportation Policy
 Directorate of Water Supply and Sewage Policy
 General Directorate of Standards and Monitoring
 Directorate for Licensing and Construction Regulations
 Directorate of Monitoring and Statistics
 Directorate of Traffic and Road Safety
 Directorate of Support Services
 Directorate of Fincance
 General Directorate for Integration
 Directorate for Projects
 Directorate for European Integration.

Officeholders (1987–present)

See also
Transportation in Albania

References

Transportation
Politics of Albania
1912 establishments in Albania
Albania